Lyceum is a former academic community in northern Pushmataha County, Oklahoma, United States, located two miles west of Tuskahoma.  

A United States Post Office was established at Lyceum, Indian Territory on March 23, 1896 and operated until July 30, 1900. Its name was chosen to reflect the fact that the community hosted the Choctaw Female Academy, also known as the Tuskahoma Female Academy.  

The academy, which opened in 1892, burned in 1925, and the community shifted to Tuskahoma. Two miles north of Tuskahoma, at what the U.S. Post Office called Council House, is the Choctaw Capitol Building, which was built in 1884. During the latter days of the Indian Territory, Tuskahoma was both a seat of government and an academic center. 

Prior to Oklahoma's statehood, Lyceum was located in Wade County, Choctaw Nation.

More information on Lyceum, the Choctaw Capitol Building, and Tuskahoma may be found in the Pushmataha County Historical Society.

References

External links

Ghost towns in Oklahoma
Geography of Pushmataha County, Oklahoma